The 1961 Georgia Tech Yellow Jackets football team represented the Georgia Institute of Technology during the 1961 NCAA University Division football season. The Yellow Jackets were led by 17th-year head coach Bobby Dodd, and played their home games at Grant Field in Atlanta. Georgia Tech finished the regular season tied for fourth in the Southeastern Conference, with a 4–3 SEC record and a 7–3 overall record. They were ranked 13th in both final polls, and were invited to the 1961 Gator Bowl, where they lost to Penn State.

Schedule

Source:

References

Georgia Tech
Georgia Tech Yellow Jackets football seasons
Georgia Tech Yellow Jackets football